The Squamish Wolf Pack were a Junior "B" Ice Hockey team based in Squamish, British Columbia, Canada. In their last season (2010-11 PIJHL season), they were members of the Tom Shaw Conference of the Pacific International Junior Hockey League (PIJHL). They played their home games at Brennan Park Arena.

History  

The Squamish Wolf Pack were founded as a PIJHL expansion team in the 2008-09 PIJHL season, as a member of the Tom Shaw Conference. After three consecutive PIJHL unsuccessful seasons, and never qualified to make the PIJHL Playoffs, the Wolf Pack relocated from Squamish, British Columbia to North Vancouver, British Columbia in the 2011-12 PIJHL season, to be renamed as the North Vancouver Wolf Pack, due to unsuccessful fan base, sponsorship, standings and statistics, as they only won six games in their last PIJHL season (2010-11 PIJHL season).

Season-by-season record  

Note: GP = Games played, W = Wins, L = Losses, OTL = Overtime Losses, Pts = Points, GF = Goals for, GA = Goals against, PIM = Penalties in minutes

References

External links  
Official website of the Squamish Wolf Pack

Ice hockey teams in British Columbia
2008 establishments in British Columbia
2011 disestablishments in British Columbia
Ice hockey clubs established in 2008
Ice hockey clubs disestablished in 2011